Checkley is a village and civil parish in the district of Staffordshire Moorlands in the English county of Staffordshire.

Location 
The village is located in the valley of the River Tean and sits astride of the A522. This road opened in April 1985 and took much of the traffic away from the village.

Population 
The 2011 census recorded a population of 4,700 within the parish of Checkley in a total of 1,944 households. The parish comes under the Staffordshire Moorlands Non-Metropolitan District.

Notable buildings and structures 
The village and parish of Checkley has a variety of listed buildings and structures including a Grade I listed parish church. In total there are 58 listed structures.

Parish Church of Saint Mary and All Saints

The parish church of Saint Mary and All Saints is a Grade I listed building. The earliest fabric in the church dates from the 12th century, with a south doorway of about 1300, and a chancel from the late 13th century. There were additions and alterations in the following two centuries, but the church was largely rebuilt in the 17th century. Inside the church is a Norman font with a carving of a donkey, the effigy of a knight on a memorial from the early 14th century, and some stained glass also from the 14th century. The stalls date from about 1535.

See also 
Listed buildings in Checkley
J. & N. Philips

References

Bibliography
 

Civil parishes in Staffordshire
Villages in Staffordshire